Societat Esportiva Penya Independent is a Spanish football club based in Sant Miquel de Balansat, in the island of Ibiza, in the Balearic Islands. Founded in 1975, they play in Tercera Federación – Group 11, holding home games at Campo Municipal de Futbol de Sant Miquel, with a capacity of 2,000 people.

History
Founded in 1975, Penya Independent played in the regional leagues until 2014, when the club became inactive. Back to action in 2019, the club played two seasons in the Regional Preferente before winning the Copa del Rey play-offs in 2021, subsequently qualifying to the preliminary rounds of the 2021–22 Copa del Rey; they were knocked out by CFJ Mollerussa, however.

On 19 June 2022, Penya Independent achieved a first-ever promotion to Tercera Federación, after defeating SCR Peña Deportiva's reserve team.

Season to season

1 season in Tercera Federación

References

External links
 
Soccerway team profile

Sport in Ibiza
Football clubs in the Balearic Islands
Association football clubs established in 1975
1975 establishments in Spain